JMB may refer to:

People 
John Moses Browning, Mormon small arms architect
José Manuel Barroso, a European politician
Jorge Mario Bergoglio, an Argentine Roman Catholic cardinal also known as Pope Francis
Jean-Michel Basquiat, American artist

Organisations 
JMB Realty, a Chicago real estate company
Jamaat-ul-Mujahideen Bangladesh, an Islamic organization in Bangladesh
Joint Matriculation Board (earlier known as the Northern Universities Joint Matriculation Board), a body in the United Kingdom which awarded O levels and A levels.
 The JAL Mileage Bank, the frequent flyer program of Japan Airlines
 Johnson Matthey Bankers, the core of a 1984 banking crisis
JMicron, a technology company. Linux reports their devices as JMB363 or similar.
James M. Bennett High School, in Salisbury, Maryland
Journal of Molecular Biology, a weekly scientific journal.